Neighborhood Gourmet (literally "Neighborhood Chef") is a Hong Kong variety food reality television series produced by TVB, hosted by Kitty Yuen and King Kong Lee. Each episode Yuen and Lee tour a different neighborhood in or around Hong Kong to scope out the most unusual and best food offerings in that neighborhood. During midway through each episode two new artistes (male and female) will tag along with the shows two main host to sample food during the viewer recommendation segment of the show. These two new artistes will also assist the host during the end cooking competition segment. Series 1 began broadcast on May 3, 2011, TVB Jade weekdays during its 10:30 to 11:00 pm time slot with a total of 29 episodes. Series 2 began broadcast on November 18, 2012, TVB Jade Sundays during its 8:00 to 9:00 pm timeslot with a total of 18 episodes. Series 3 began broadcast on April 26, 2015, on TVB Jade Sundays suring it 7:35 to 8:30 timeslot with an expected 18 episodes total. This series will be filmed abroad focusing on each countries specialty cuisine instead of neighborhoods, but the shows format will remain the same.

Format
Each episode, host's Kitty Yuen and King Kong Lee visit a different neighborhood in and around the Hong Kong area, sampling unique food offerings and critiquing their comments about the food and establishment's atmosphere. They also visit food establishments recommended by viewer blog messages. Near the later half of the show they visit a local restaurant and meet the chef and owner of the establishment. During their conversations with the chef they ask questions about the uniqueness of the dishes they have sampled, they then choose a dish to duplicate, the chef gives them a quick lesson on how to cook the dish and with assistants by their side, both Yuen and Lee have a competition to see who can best duplicate the chef's dish. The results on who wins are decided by 10 randomly selected passerby who are asked to taste both dishes and vote on whose dish they like better by choosing Yuen's or Lee's cartoon panel board. The one with the most votes wins and the loser is then given a punishment decided by the chef. 
Segments:
Neighborhood introduction - The two host introduce the neighborhood of each episode.
Street sweep - The hosts food tour around the neighborhood. 
Neighborhood recommendations - The hosts randomly ask locals on the street for good eats recommendations.
Restaurant spotlight - The owner and chef of a local restaurant shows their best offered dishes.
PK challenge - The hosts choose a dish from the "Restaurant spotlight" segment to duplicate as their competition dish.
Choose the winner - 10 Randomly chosen people are asked to taste both teams dishes and choose their favorite. The team with majority points wins.
Comments from the chef - The chef from the "Restaurant spotlight" segment critiques the loser on why their dish lost. 
Loser's punishment - The loser is given a punishment by the chef of  the "Restaurant spotlight" segment.

Series 2, the broadcast time was expanded from 20 minutes to 45 minutes per episode. The segments remained the same as the first series with more restaurants featured and the addition of the celebrity guest segments. 
Added segments:
Celebrity guest - A Hong Kong celebrity introduces their three favorite dishes from three different restaurants in that neighborhood. Both host try all three dishes and choose which is their favorite. They then go the chosen dish restaurant.
Spotlight on the chosen restaurant - The hosts and the celebrity guest go to the chosen restaurant and are introduced to more food offerings from that restaurant. The hosts try each dish and critiques their comments.

Series 3, the show is filmed partially abroad in the nearby Asian countries of Singapore, Taiwan, Malaysia and South Korean. Each country is featured across a number of episodes, with each episode focusing on a specialty dish from that country instead of neighborhoods. A Hong Kong celebrity tags along with the host in minimal scenes to sample food with them and also serve as the "punisher" during the PK challenge results. The series also finds restaurants of that country's cuisine available in Hong Kong. Both host's are given foreign country assistant's abroad and Hong Kong assistants when they're in Hong Kong. Each episode's final competition sometimes takes place at the country they are visiting and sometimes in Hong Kong at a food establishment that specializes in that country's cuisine.

Series 1
Title: Neighborhood Gourmet (街坊廚神)
Broadcast: May 3 - June 10, 2011

Episodes

: King Kong received enough points to win so a total of 10 tasters was not needed.
: Kitty Yuen received enough points to win so a total of 10 tasters was not needed.
: Episode 24 - Felix Wong was a surprise guest during the street sweep segment since he was at one of the restaurants the crew was filming at.
: Episode 29 - Final PK. Bosco Wong and Chrissie Chau served as special guest assistant's.

Locations

Series 2
Title: Neighborhood Gourmet 2  (街坊廚神食四方)
Broadcast: November 18, 2012 - April 14, 2013

Episodes

: Sr.2 episode 4 - King Kong's former Taiwan colleagues (Sasa, Xie Zheng Hao, Aaron Chen, Anthony Guo,  Angus Guo,  Shanny Tou, Yen Yung Lie) from the TVBS variety show Super Taste (食尚玩家) were special guest on the show since they were in Hong Kong filming their show. King Kong and Kitty Yuen was also featured on Super Taste December 18, 2012 episode.
: Sr.2 episode 18 - Evergreen Mak and Nancy Wu also served as assistants during the final PK challenge.

Locations

: Sr.2 episode 6 - Stephen Huynh is part owner of the celebrity recommended restaurant, A La Maison Restaurant & Bar.
: Sr.2 episode 11 - Ling Ling House (韓式本家) is owned by former TVB actress and entertainment news correspondent Angel Sung's mother.

Series 3
Title: Neighborhood Gourmet 3  (街坊廚神舌戰新台韓)
Broadcast: April 26, 2015 - August 23, 2015

Episodes

: Sr.3 episode 8 - Timmy Hung, Oscar Leung and Russell Cheung were surprised special guests since the restaurant they were dining at was being filmed by the show.: Sr.3 episode 10 - King Kong's mother, younger sister, brother-in-law and nephew were special guests during the Taipei, Taiwan segment.

Locations

: Sr.3 episode 8 - Monga Fried Chicken (艋舺雞排) is owned by Taiwanese comedian NoNo (陳宣裕).: Sr.3 episode 8 - Alan Tam and Eric Tsang are part owners of Super Dai Chong Wah (Super大中華火鍋).

Assistants
Assistants are new or unknown artistes who tag along with the hosts. A male assistant teams up with Kitty Yuen while King Kong Lee has a female assistant that teams up with him. TVB uses this as a way to promote the new or unknown artistes.

In the first series the assistants accompany the two host almost throughout each entire episode.

In the second series the assistants only accompany the hosts during the viewer restaurants recommendation and final dish replica cooking competition segments.

During the third series, the series is filmed partially in an abroad country and Hong Kong. When the hosts are in the abroad country they have two new or unknown artistes that is local to that country. When they're in Hong Kong, two new Hong Kong artistes accompanies them. Final dish replica cooking completion takes place sometimes in the abroad country and sometimes in Hong Kong at a restaurant themed to that country's local cuisine.

Series 1

Series 2

Series 3

Viewership Ratings
Series 1

Series 2

Series 3

Reception
The pairing of Kitty Yuen and King Kong Lee was well received by viewers. The comic relief and chemistry of the two host lead many to speculate that they were in a May–December romance, which Lee flatly denied by telling reporters that Yuen was too old for him. While Yuen joked with reporters that the two might have a chance to be a couple. 
The popularity of their collaboration also lead TVB to cast both as the male and female lead of an upcoming drama called Love as a Predatory Affair (愛情食物鏈), which started filming in May 2015.

References

External links
 Neighborhood Gourmet (Sr.1) TVB official website
 Neighborhood Gourmet (Sr.2) TVB official website
 Neighborhood Gourmet (Sr.3) TVB official website

TVB original programming
2011 Hong Kong television series debuts
2011 Hong Kong television series endings
2012 Hong Kong television series debuts
2013 Hong Kong television series endings
2015 Hong Kong television series debuts